Crawford River may refer to:

In Australia
 Crawford River (New South Wales), a river in New South Wales
 Crawford River (Victoria), a river in Victoria